Senior–Løken syndrome is a congenital eye disorder, first characterized in 1961.  It is a rare, ciliopathic, autosomal recessive disorder characterized by juvenile nephronophthis and progressive eye disease.

Genetics
Genes involved include:

Pathophysiology
The cause of Senior–Løken syndrome type 5 has been identified to mutation in the NPHP1 gene which adversely affects the protein formation mechanism of the cilia.

Relation to other rare genetic disorders 
Recent findings in genetic research have suggested that a large number of genetic disorders, both genetic syndromes and genetic diseases, that were not previously identified in the medical literature as related, may be, in fact, highly related in the genetypical root cause of the widely varying, phenotypically-observed disorders.  Such diseases are becoming known as ciliopathies.  Known ciliopathies include primary ciliary dyskinesia, Bardet–Biedl syndrome, polycystic kidney and liver disease, nephronophthisis, Alström syndrome, Meckel–Gruber syndrome and some forms of retinal degeneration.

Diagnosis

Treatment

References

External links 
  
  
 NCBI Genetic Testing Registry

Congenital disorders
Autosomal recessive disorders
Rare diseases
Syndromes affecting the eye
Ciliopathy